Anangeon ("necessary"), also known as dicaeologia ("a plea in defense"), is a specious method of argument, where the basis lies in inevitability or necessity. For example, "Yes, I missed school today, but I was sick and wouldn't have learned anything anyway"—this argument ignores the need to go to school, mitigating the controversy of not going. Thus, it is often used to limit or contradict fault in a matter.

Anangeon can be seen as a part of logos and is a type of non sequitur.

See also
Ethos
Pathos
Rationalization (making excuses)

References

Rhetorical techniques
Arguments
Informal fallacies